Boles is a surname. Notable people with the surname include:

Billy J. Boles (born 1938), American Air Force general
Boles baronets, British gentry family
Brad Boles (born 1963), American politician
Carl Boles (born 1934), American baseball player
Charles Earl Boles ( 1829–after February 28, 1888), British-born American stagecoach robber, prospector, and soldier [see: Black Bart (outlaw)]
Dennis Boles (British Army officer) (1885–1958), soldier and Conservative politician
Denyc Boles (born ?), American politician
Eckhard Boles (born 1963), German microbiologist, biotechnologist, and professor
Ewing T. Boles (1895–1992), American investment banker and philanthropist
H. Leo Boles (1874–1946), American preacher, writer, and academic administrator
Henry Clifford Boles (1910–1979), American architect
Jack Boles (1913–2013), British Colonial civil servant and administrator
James L. Boles Jr. (born 1961), American politician
Jason Boles (1851–1920), Australian politician
Jim Boles (1914–1977), American actor
Joe Boles (1880–1950), Australian footballer
John Boles (disambiguation), several people
Ken Boles (1933-2022), American politician
Kevin Boles (born 1975), American baseball player and manager
Lawrence C. Boles (1883–1943), American college football player and coach
Nick Boles (born 1965), British politician
Philana Marie Boles (born ?), American young adult author
Stanley A. Boles (1887–1961), American basketball and golf coach, and university athletic director
Thomas Boles (1837–1905), American politician and judge
Tom Boles (born 1944), Scottish amateur astronomer, author, and broadcaster
Tony Boles (born 1967), American football player
Vincent E. Boles ( 1976–2009), American army general